Anne Hubinger (born 31 July 1993) is a German handball player for Thüringer HC and the German national team.

Achievements
Handball-Bundesliga Frauen:
Winner: 2018

References

1993 births
Living people
German female handball players
Sportspeople from Mecklenburg-Western Pomerania